Brigadier Dame Mary Frances Coulshed, DBE, TD (10 November 1904 – 1998) was a British Army officer who served as Director of the Women's Royal Army Corps (WRAC).

She was appointed Dame Commander of the Order of the British Empire (DBE) for her services to the British Army and the WRAC in the 1953 Coronation Honours.

She died unmarried in 1998.

External links
Oxford Dictionary National Biography entry (subscription required site)
Coulshed's papers archive site

Auxiliary Territorial Service officers
British Army personnel of World War II
Dames Commander of the Order of the British Empire
British women in World War II
Women's Royal Army Corps officers
1904 births
1998 deaths
Date of death unknown